John Andrew Henry Forrest  (born 18 November 1961), nicknamed Twiggy, is an Australian businessman. He is best known as the former CEO (and current non-executive chairman) of Fortescue Metals Group (FMG), and has other interests in the mining industry and in cattle stations.

With an assessed net worth of 27.25 billion according to the Financial Review 2021 Rich List, Forrest was ranked as the second richest Australian. According to the Financial Review, Forrest was the richest person in Australia in 2008.

In 2013, Andrew and Nicola Forrest, his wife, were the first Australian billionaires to pledge the majority of their wealth to charity in their lifetimes. He had earlier stepped down as CEO of Fortescue Metals in 2011. Much of the Forrest's philanthropy has been through either the Minderoo Foundation (focusing on education and Indigenous Australians) or the Walk Free Foundation (focusing on ending modern slavery), both of which he established. Forrest has been accused of avoiding paying company tax, having revealed in 2011 that Fortescue had never paid company tax.

Early life 
John Andrew Henry Forrest was born on 18 November 1961 in Perth, Western Australia, the youngest of three children of Judith (née Fry) and Donald Forrest. His father, grandfather (Mervyn), and great-grandfather (David) were all managers of Minderoo Station, which David had established in 1878 with his brothers, Alexander and John. John, Alexander, David, and Mervyn were all members of parliament for periods, with John serving as Western Australia's first premier. Forrest's early years were spent at Minderoo, located in the Pilbara region south of Onslow. Minderoo was owned by the Forrest family until it was sold in 1998 by his father due to relentless drought and debt, but it was bought back by Forrest in 2009.

Forrest was educated at Onslow Primary School and through the School of the Air before moving to Perth to attend Christ Church Grammar School and then Hale School. He stuttered as a child, which is how he came to develop a relationship with Ian Black, whose Aboriginal father, Scotty, became Forrest's mentor. Forrest went on to the University of Western Australia where he majored in economics and politics.

In 1991 Forrest married Nicola Maurice, daughter of Tony Maurice who was a major figure in the Australian League of Rights Christian organisation. Nicola's sister, Katrina, is the wife of David Thompson who was the leader of the New Zealand League of Rights in the early 1980s and the leader of the Australian League of Rights during the 1990s. Forrest and David Thompson became friendly associates with Forrest appointing Thompson to a managerial role while he was on the board at Anaconda Nickel.

Career

Anaconda Nickel
After graduating, Forrest worked as a stockbroker at the brokerage houses Kirke Securities and Jacksons. After noticing that the demand for stainless steel was rising at 4 per cent a year, he quit stockbroking and got into nickel mining by founding Anaconda Nickel.He became the founding CEO of Anaconda Nickel in 1993, after buying a stake in the company. However, in 2001 he was ousted as CEO when the company almost collapsed. US bondholders received $0.26 for each dollar of debt in the restructuring. The company's shares fell by 89% before it was taken over by Glencore and renamed Minara Resources.

Fortescue Metals

In April 2003, he took control of Allied Mining and Processing, which had rights to iron ore in the Pilbara, and renamed it Fortescue Metals Group (FMG). He remains a major shareholder of FMG, through his private company, The Metal Group. Fortescue made its first iron ore shipment to China in May 2008. Fortescue increased its capacity to 155 million tonnes per annum through a $9.2 billion expansion in 2014. Since then, the company has grown to possess three times the tenements of its nearest rival in Western Australia's iron ore rich Pilbara region. Fortescue holds major deposits at Mount Nicholas, Christmas Creek, Cloudbreak, and Tongolo. In 2007, he took an interest and a directorship in Niagara Mining Limited, renamed Poseidon Nickel Limited, which had in 2006 acquired from WMC the Windara nickel deposits near Laverton, Western Australia.

Forrest described the Gillard Government proposed Minerals Resource Rent Tax (MRRT) as "economic vandalism" and a "mad dog's breakfast" that would drive up foreign resource ownership. He stated he would challenge it in the High Court as being unconstitutional, as it discriminates against states, and fails to appropriately capture big producers BHP Billiton and Rio Tinto. WA premier Colin Barnett has stated the state government would back constitutional action, admitting the tax had been suggested to him as a "sovereign risk". He was highly critical of the government's expenditure of $38M on an advertising campaign, that was not approved using the usual processes, as it had to "counter mining industry 'spin' about the resources super profits tax".

The former treasurer Wayne Swan said the big miners would pay at least A$2 billion tax, and wrote to the head of BDO Accounting, who modelled the claims Forrest used, noting they were "utterly unrealistic" and riddled with errors. Treasury concurred that they would be unable to release the assumptions underpinning its forecasts, as they were based on confidential information provided by the big miners. Gillard struck a deal with BHP Billiton, Rio Tinto and Xstrata to develop the MRRT. Independent MP Andrew Wilkie requested the government take Forrest's mining tax grievance to heart.

In August 2021, it was announced that Forrest would receive a $2.4 billion dividend on Fortescue's record profit.

Tattarang

Tattarang is the holding company for the Forrest family’s private business interests. Tattarang invests in a diverse range of businesses across agri-food, energy, health technology, property, resources, and lifestyle. The group is made up of six business divisions: Fiveight, Harvest Road, Squadron Energy, Tenmile, Wyloo Metals and Z1Z.

Global Rapid Rugby 

Following SANZAAR's decision to reduce the number of Super Rugby teams for 2018, the Australian Rugby Union (now Rugby Australia) announced in August 2017 that Perth-based rugby team Western Force would be one of the teams cut from the 2018 competition. In the following month, Forrest announced that he would create a new tournament called the Indo Pacific Rugby Championship which would include the Western Force and five other teams from the Indo-Pacific region. For the 2018 season, the competition was launched as World Series Rugby, played as a series of exhibition matches as the precursor to a wider Asia-Pacific competition planned for 2019.

The competition was rebranded in November 2018 as Global Rapid Rugby. A season of fourteen matches was played in 2019. The 2020 Global Rapid Rugby season was cancelled due to the COVID-19 pandemic after only one completed round of competition.

Cattle industry

In 2020, Forrest acquired both Quanbun and neighbouring property, Jubilee Downs, in the Kimberley region of Western Australia for over 30 million.

BioMD
In June 2011, Allied Medical, of which Forrest owned 46%, was acquired by BioMD for over 20 million.

Recognition and honours

Forrest has an Australian Centenary Medal, Australian Sports Medal, was awarded the 2017 Western Australian of the Year Award, and the 2018 EY Entrepreneur of the Year Alumni Social Impact Award.

In 2017 Forrest was appointed an Officer of the Order of Australia for distinguished service to the mining sector, to the development of employment and business opportunities, as a supporter of sustainable foreign investment, and to philanthropy.

In 2019 Forrest was awarded a PhD in Marine Science from the University of Western Australia, and has a strong interest in maintaining the health of the oceans.

Other roles

Forrest is well-connected in political, business, and sporting circles. He is an adjunct professor at the Chinese Southern University and a fellow of the Australasian Institute of Mining & Metallurgy. He is a former director of Australia's Export Finance and Insurance Corporation and the Chamber of Minerals and Energy of Western Australia, and former chairman of Athletics Australia.

He has addressed the Queensland University of Technology, and Christians in the Marketplace.
He gave the 2020 Boyer Lectures to outline a case for hydrogen energy and ways to manage human impacts on the oceans.

Philanthropy
Andrew and Nicola Forrest made The Giving Pledge in 2013, stating:

Indigenous Australians

After stepping down as chief executive officer of FMG, Forrest noted that he had been spending more than 50% of his time on Indigenous philanthropy. Forrest became an ambassador for the Australian Indigenous Education Foundation. Encouraged by the philanthropy of the Rockefeller Group, Warren Buffett, and Melinda and Bill Gates, Andrew and Nicola Forrest established the Australian Children's Trust in 2001. 

Through the influence of Scotty Black, Forrest started the GenerationOne project, with assistance from James Packer and Kerry Stokes, who each donated 2 million, along with the support of their respective media stations, Channel 9 and Channel 7. GenerationOne and the Australian Children's Trust help to create sustainable solutions on addressing social disadvantage. With Kevin Rudd, Forrest launched the Australian Employment Covenant, that campaigned for businesses to hire Indigenous Australians, as they could "add value" to Australian businesses because they were "professional and reliable and wonderful" and that there is no reason for Indigenous disparity. GenerationOne ran a series of television advertisements privately funded by Forrest, Packer and Stokes. Between 2008 and 2011, Forrest obtained 253 business signatories to his covenant. With Rudd, Forrest planned to employ 50,000 Aboriginal people. As the two-year deadline approached, estimates put the number of Indigenous job placements under the scheme at around 2,800, well short of the original goal.

Forrest is opposed to welfare dependency for Indigenous Australians. He has recounted stories of young Aboriginal girls in the Pilbara offering men sex for cigarettes, leading to five indigenous women from the region collectively lodging a complaint with the Human Rights and Equal Opportunity Commission that Forrest's comment was racist and vilified the community. Forrest has been publicly accused of engaging in questionable methods of land acquisition, and has had accusations levelled at his company for failing Indigenous trainees at FMG's vocational training centre in Port Hedland.

In 2013, Forrest was chosen to lead an Australian Government review into Indigenous employment and training programs. Delivered on 1 August 2014 with 27 recommendations, the review proposed the creation of the Cashless Welfare Card.

Slavery and human trafficking
Forrest's daughter, Grace volunteered at an orphanage in Nepal and discovered the children she had looked after had been trafficked to be sex slaves in the Middle East. This distressed Grace and motivated her father to act. Grace, aged 21 years, said at a 2014 interfaith meeting held at the Vatican, "I feel like a puppet for hundreds of thousands of girls who are voiceless – if I can stand for them, that is what I'm here to do."

Forrest established the Walk Free Foundation in 2010 to fight modern slavery. In 2013 the organisation launched the Global Slavery Index ranking 162 countries "based on a combined measure of three factors: estimated prevalence of modern slavery by population, a measure of child marriage, and a measure of human trafficking in and out of a country". The Index estimates there are 29 million slaves worldwide, roughly half in India and Pakistan. In January 2014, Forrest announced a deal with Pakistan to do away with more than two million slaves in return for cheap coal.

Forrest founded the Global Freedom Network that the Pope, the Archbishop of Canterbury, and the Grand Imam of al-Azhar lead. The Global Freedom Network works to stop all religious faiths from using organisations involved with slavery in their supply chain. 

In 2014 Andrew and Grace Forrest attended a meeting held in the Vatican, being a Joint Religious Leaders Declaration Against Modern Slavery. The anti-slavery declaration was signed by Pope Francis, Mata Amritanandamayi, Justin Welby, Thích Nhất Hạnh, K. Sri Dhammananda, David Rosen, Ecumenical Patriarch Bartholomew, Abraham Skorka, Mohamed Ahmed El-Tayeb, Mohammad Taqi al-Modarresi, Basheer Hussain al-Najafi, and Omar Abboudreligious leaders representing forms of Christianity, Judaism, Islam, Hinduism and Buddhism. Welby, the Archbishop of Canterbury, urged consumers to demand more information about whether forced labour was involved in goods they bought.

Other philanthropic interests
, Forrest had injected 90 million into his children's charity. In October 2013 it was announced that Forrest was to donate 65 million towards higher education in Western Australia. At the time the sum was believed to be the highest philanthropic donation in Australia, with most going toward funding scholarships.

The Minderoo Foundation, Forrest's private foundation, was renamed as the Minderoo Group is to be expanded to include higher education contributions. The foundation has given 270 million through the foundation since 2001. In 2014, Andrew and Nicola Forrest pledged 65 million over ten years through the Minderoo Foundation, establishing the Forrest Research Foundation to offer scholarships to students pursuing a PhD at a Western Australian university. In 2017 Forrest donated 400 million to medical research and social causes, and in 2019 donated a further 655 million to expand the existing work of the Minderoo Foundation in areas including cancer research, early childhood development, ocean health, and eliminating modern slavery, the largest ever living donation by any Australian philanthropist.

Personal life
Forrest is a Christian and is married with four children: Grace, Sophia, Matilda and Sydney.

Forrest purchased the  superyacht Pangaea in 2018. Built by US shipyard Halter Marine in 1999, the yacht is registered in Montego Bay, Jamaica. Forrest turned the yacht into an ocean research vessel for the Minderoo Foundation, with multiple laboratories and specialist research equipment installed since its purchase.

In December 2015, Forrest purchased the heritage-listed Tukurua mansion in Cottesloe for $16 million. The Forrest family housed refugees at the home for a period of time after the purchase. A restoration and development of additional buildings was completed in 2019.  In 2022, Forrest purchased the nearby heritage-listed Le Fanu House.

Net worth

References

External links 

 Andrew & Nicola Forrest Giving Pledge
 Australian Employment Covenant
 GenerationOne
 Minderoo Foundation
 Official profile on Forbes
 Transcript of Four Corners interview 12 August 2002

1961 births
Australian billionaires
Australian Christians
Australian company founders
Australian stock traders
Fortescue Metals Group
Giving Pledgers
21st-century philanthropists
Living people
People educated at Christ Church Grammar School
People educated at Hale School
People from Perth, Western Australia
University of Western Australia alumni
Australian mining entrepreneurs
Officers of the Order of Australia
Rugby union chairmen and investors
Australian miners